Lety is a municipality and village in Prague-West District in the Central Bohemian Region of the Czech Republic. It has about 1,500 inhabitants.

Twin towns – sister cities

Lety is twinned with:
 Ailertchen, Germany

Gallery

References

Villages in Prague-West District